Eugene Edward Achtymichuk (born September 7, 1932) is a Canadian retired professional ice hockey centre. He played 32 games in the National Hockey League with the Montreal Canadiens and Detroit Red Wings between 1952 and 1959. The rest of his career, which lasted from 1952 to 1972, was spent in various minor leagues. Achtymichuk was born in Lamont, Alberta.

Playing career 
Gene Achtymichuk played a total of 32 NHL games spanned over almost a decade. He began his career by playing one game for the Montreal Canadiens in 1951–52. Five years later, in 1956–57, he played another three games for the Canadiens. The following season saw Gene achieve a career high 16 games played. This is also the season that he scored all of his three career goals and eight career points. The next season, his last NHL season, he played 12 games for the Detroit Red Wings.

While Gene Achtymichuk was not playing at the NHL level, he was playing in various other minor leagues.

Career statistics

Regular season and playoffs

External links 
 

1932 births
Living people
Buffalo Bisons (AHL) players
Canadian ice hockey centres
Canadian people of Ukrainian descent
Detroit Red Wings players
Edmonton Flyers (WHL) players
Ice hockey people from Alberta
Knoxville Knights players
Long Island Ducks (ice hockey) players
Montreal Canadiens players
Montreal Royals (QSHL) players
People from Lamont, Alberta
Portland Buckaroos players
Quebec Aces (QSHL) players
Sudbury Wolves (EPHL) players
Victoria Cougars (1949–1961) players